Moonlight is a 2016 American drama film directed by Barry Jenkins. It is an adaptation of Tarell Alvin McCraney's play In Moonlight Black Boys Look Blue. Produced by Dede Gardner, Jeremy Kleiner, and Adele Romanski, it focuses on the life of Chiron, an African-American homosexual man struggling with his sexuality and identity while growing up in Miami, Florida. Moonlight stars Trevante Rhodes as Adult Chiron and André Holland as Adult Kevin, Chiron's closest friend. Naomie Harris, Mahershala Ali, and Janelle Monáe feature in supporting roles as Paula (Chiron's mother who suffers with drug addiction), Juan (a drug dealer), and Teresa (Juan's girlfriend) respectively. Moonlight premiered at the Telluride Film Festival on September 2, 2016. It also screened at the Toronto International Film Festival on September 10, 2016, and the New York Film Festival on October 2, 2016. The film is the first produced by A24, which provided an initial limited release on October 21 before expanding to a wide release on November 18 at more than 600 theaters. It grossed a worldwide total of over $65 million at the box office on a $1.5 million budget. Review aggregator website Rotten Tomatoes surveyed 392 reviews and judged 98% to be positive.

Moonlight garnered awards and nominations in a variety of categories with particular praise for its direction and the performances of Ali and Harris. At the 89th Academy Awards, the film received eight nominations including Best Picture, Best Director for Jenkins and Best Supporting Actress for Harris. It went on to win Best Picture, Best Supporting Actor for Ali, and Best Adapted Screenplay. At the ceremony, romantic musical La La Land was incorrectly announced as the winner of Best Picture after the presenters had been given the wrong envelope. Moonlight was both the first film with an all-Black cast and the first LGBT-themed film to win Best Picture and Ali's win was the first for a Muslim actor in Academy Awards history. The film garnered six nominations at the 74th Golden Globe Awards and won Best Motion Picture – Drama. At the 70th British Academy Film Awards, Moonlight earned four nominations including Best Film, Best Actor in a Supporting Role for Ali, and Best Actress in a Supporting Role for Harris.

At the 32nd Independent Spirit Awards, the film won six awards including Best Film, Best Director for Jenkins, and Best Screenplay. Moonlight garnered three nominations at the 23rd Screen Actors Guild Awards with Ali winning for Outstanding Performance by a Male Actor in a Supporting Role. It also received a nomination at the 69th Directors Guild of America Awards and 28th Producers Guild of America Awards. At the 22nd Critics' Choice Awards, Moonlight earned ten nominations including Best Picture, Best Director for Jenkins, and Best Supporting Actress for Harris. It went on to win Best Supporting Actor for Ali and Best Acting Ensemble. The American Film Institute included the film in their top ten movies of 2016.

Accolades

See also 
2016 in film

Notes

References

External links 
 

Lists of accolades by film